Leposoma annectans is a species of lizard in the family Gymnophthalmidae. It is endemic to Brazil.

References

Leposoma
Reptiles of Brazil
Endemic fauna of Brazil
Reptiles described in 1952
Taxa named by Rodolfo Ruibal